Shi Lemeng (b.12 October 1915 – 2008) was a Chinese composer who served in the People's Liberation Army. He was born in Yichuan county, Shaanxi province in China. Among his best known works in the Chinese-language western-style opera Two Women of the Red Army (Liangge nv hongjun) to a libretto by Chen Qitong.

References

People's Republic of China composers
Chinese male classical composers
Chinese classical composers
Chinese opera composers
Male opera composers
1915 births
2008 deaths
Republic of China musicians
Musicians from Luoyang
20th-century male musicians